Aleksey Sayarovich Arifullin (13 October 1970 − 28 September 2017) was a Russian association footballer.

Club career
Arifullin played in the Russian Top League with FC Lokomotiv Moscow, FC Krylia Sovetov Samara and FC Dynamo Moscow. He never scored in a league match, and is one of a few players to make more than 100 appearances in the league without scoring a goal.

Honours
 Russian Premier League runner-up: 1995, 1999.
 Russian Premier League bronze: 1994, 1998.
 Russian Cup winner: 1996, 1997, 2000.
 Russian Cup finalist: 1990, 1998.

International career
Born in Moscow, Arifullin played his only international game for Russia on 22 April 1998 in a friendly against Turkey.

European club competitions
All with FC Lokomotiv Moscow.

 UEFA Cup 1993–94: 2 games.
 UEFA Cup 1995–96: 2 games.
 UEFA Cup Winners' Cup 1996–97 : 1 game.
 UEFA Cup Winners' Cup 1997–98: 7 games (reached semifinal).
 UEFA Cup Winners' Cup 1998–99: 7 games (reached semifinal).
 UEFA Cup 1999–2000: 5 games.

References

External links
  Profile

1970 births
2017 deaths
Soviet footballers
Russian footballers
Russia international footballers
Soviet Top League players
Russian Premier League players
FC Lokomotiv Moscow players
FC Moscow players
PFC Krylia Sovetov Samara players
FC Dynamo Moscow players
Footballers from Moscow
Association football defenders